John Hillesley (by 1508 – 1566?), of Beenham, Berkshire and Leominster, Herefordshire, was an English politician.

He was a Member (MP) of the Parliament of England for Leominster in 1529.

References

1566 deaths
English MPs 1529–1536
People from Leominster
People from West Berkshire District
Year of birth uncertain